Veretzky is the name two a Rabbinic dynasties and communities, both originating in Nyzhni Vorota, Ukraine (known as Veretzky in Yiddish), near the borders with Hungary and Slovakia. While the dynasty reestablished its court in the United States, a Rabbinic dynasty of the same name  has been recently established in Israel as well.

Landau family dynasty

History 

Rabbi Moshe Ber Landau served as the rabbi and dayan (rabbinic judge) of Nyzhni Vorota. His son Rabbi Shalom Noach Landau served as the village's rabbi after him, while another son, Rabbi Yitzchak Meir Landau, served as rabbi of Khust. Rabbi Yitzchak Meir's son, Rabbi Yechezkel Shraga Landau, also served as a rabbi, for a time in Nyzhni Vorota as well as in Yaasin and Nitra. While both Rabbi Shalom Noach and Rabbi Yitzchak Meir were killed in the Holocaust, Rabbi Yechezkel Shraga was not, and emigrated to the United States after World War II, settling initially in Williamsburg, Brooklyn. 

In 1952, he moved to the Midwood neighborhood of Brooklyn and reestablished the community of his ancestors with the opening a synagogue called Khal Hisachdis Yirieim Veretzky, becoming known as the Veretzkier Rebbe. It moved to its current location on Avenue L and East 9th Street in around 1970. In 1980, Rabbi Landau arranged for more minyanim to take place in the synagogue, turning it into a "minyan factory" (a synagogue with minyanim available throughout the day). In 1986, Rabbi Landau established a yeshiva that would become known as Yeshiva Ohr Shraga Veretzky, a yeshiva for Jewish children living in the neighborhood, which blossomed in the Mosdos Veretzky yeshiva network.

Rabbi Yechezkel Shraga died in 1996 and his son, Rabbi Aharon Tzvi Landau, known during his tenure as the Veretzkier Rav, succeeded him as rabbi of the community, a position he held until his death in 2003. He was succeeded by his son, Rabbi Yitzchak Meir Landau, who is the current Veretzkier Rav.

Today 

The Khal Hisachdus Yirieim Veretzky synagogue, popularly known as Rabbi Landau's Shul or simply as Landau's, is one of the most well known Orthodox Jewish synagogues in Brooklyn. The synagogue established the Keren Zichron Rabbeinu Yechezkel Shraga fund for impoverished families, named after the founding rabbi of the community.

Mosdos Veretzky, the network of yeshivas founded by Rabbi Yechezkel Shraga Landau, currently includes four schools: Yeshiva Ohr Shraga elementary school and Mesivta Orchos Tzvi high school in Midwood, Ohr Shragelech Marine Park preschool in Marine Park, and Yeshiva Ohr Shraga Lakewood elementary school in Lakewood Township, New Jersey. The network of schools is run under the auspices of Rabbi Shalom Noah Landau, son of Rabbi Ahron Tzvi & brother to Rabbi Yitzchok Meir.

Lineage 

 Rabbi Moshe Ber Landau of Veretzky 
 Rabbi Shalom Noach Landau of Veretzky
 Rabbi Yitzchak Meir Landau (I) of Khust
 Rabbi Yechezkel Shraga Landau of Veretzky
 Rabbi Aharon Tzvi Landau of Veretzky
 Rabbi Yitzchak Meir Landau (II) of Veretzky

Veretzky Offshoot in Israel

History 

Rabbi Elazar Weiser of Veretzky served as a rabbi in Veretzky in the nineteenth century. His son-in-law was Rabbi Alexander (Sender) Yom Tov Lipa Eichenstein of Ziditshov, the son of Rabbi Yitzchak Isaac of Ziditshov whose son, Rabbi Yissachar Ber Eichenstein (1850-1924), served as rebbe in Veretzky for a short stint before becoming rebbe in Ziditshov. Rabbi Yissachar Berish's son, Rabbi Moshe Eichenstein (1874-1935), served as rebbe Veretzky for some time as well, as did Rabbi Moshe's son, Rabbi Eliyahu Eichenstein.

Today, the Veretzky chasidic court in Israel is likely an offshoot of the Ziditshov chassidic dynasty, and it is unclear why its founder chose the Veretzky name. Its Rebbe, Rabbi Yitzchak Isaac Labin, resides in Bnei Brak. He is the son of Rabbi Naftali Tzvi Labin of Ziditshov and a distant relative of the Eichensteins.

Lineage

See also 
Zidichov (Hasidic dynasty)
Komarno (Hasidic dynasty)

Notes and references  

Hasidic dynasties
Hasidic Judaism in Ukraine
People from Zakarpattia Oblast
Culture in Zakarpattia Oblast
Orthodox Judaism in New York City
Rabbinic dynasties